Ethyl bromoacetate is the chemical compound with the formula CH2BrCO2C2H5. It is the ethyl ester of bromoacetic acid and is prepared in two steps from acetic acid. It is a lachrymator and has a fruity, pungent odor. It is also a highly toxic alkylating agent and may be fatal if inhaled.

Applications
Ethyl bromoacetate is listed by the World Health Organization as a riot control agent, and was first employed for that purpose by French police in 1912. The French army used rifle grenades 'grenades lacrymogènes' filled with this gas against the Germans beginning in August 1914, but the weapons were largely ineffective, even though ethyl bromoacetate is twice as toxic as chlorine. In the early months of the war the British also used the weaponized use of tear gas agents and more toxic gasses including sulfur dioxide. The German army then used these attacks to justify their subsequent employment of it as odorant or warning agent in odorless, toxic gases and chemical weapons in 1915 under the German code Weisskreuz (White Cross).

In organic synthesis, it is a versatile alkylating agent.  Its major application involves the Reformatsky reaction, wherein it reacts with zinc to form a zinc enolate.  The resulting BrZnCH2CO2Et condenses with carbonyl compounds to give a β-hydroxy-esters.

It is also the starting point for the preparation of several other reagents.  For example, the related Wittig reagent (prepared by reaction with triphenylphosphine) is commonly used to prepare alpha,beta-unsaturated esters from carbonyl compounds such as benzaldehyde:

References

External links
 Environmental Health & Safety dept, Northeastern University

Alkylating agents
Ethyl esters
Acetate esters
Organobromides
Lachrymatory agents
World War I chemical weapons
Reagents for organic chemistry

Organic Chemistry